Penia is a sweet bread that originated in rural Italy and is made during the Easter holiday. Ingredients include sugar, butter, eggs, anise seeds and lemons.

References

Italian breads
Sweet breads
Easter bread
Anise
Easter traditions in Italy